Daniel Romanchuk (born 3 August 1998) is an American Paralympic athlete who competes primarily in wheelchair racing events. He won the Chicago Marathon on October 7, 2018; just under a month later, he became the first American to win the men's wheelchair race at the New York City Marathon, as well as the youngest winner in the history of the wheelchair event in New York.

Romanchuk followed up these wins with a win at the Boston Marathon on April 15, 2019. He became the first American man to win Boston's wheelchair division since 1993. With his victory at the London Marathon in April 2019, Romanchuk also won the World Para Athletics Marathon Championships title.

Early life
Romanchuk was born in Mount Airy, Maryland with spina bifida, a birth defect in which there is incomplete closing of the backbone and membranes around the spinal cord. When he was 2, his parents enrolled him in an adaptive sports program linked to the Kennedy Krieger Institute in nearby Baltimore. He participated in his first track meet at age 6, but also took part in other sports, including archery, sled hockey, and softball. In track events, he set age-group records and took part in national competitions at an early age.

Paralympics
In the winter of 2014, Romanchuk's mother Kim encouraged him to focus more on track in an effort to make the 2016 Paralympic team. He made the team at age 18, and competed in every track event in Rio, from the 100m to the 5000m.

In 2021, he won the gold medal in the men's 400 metres T54 event at the 2020 Summer Paralympics held in Tokyo, Japan. He also won the bronze medal in the men's marathon T54 event.

Marathon racing
Romanchuk entered and finished the Baltimore Marathon, his first, at the age of 14. In April 2018, he placed 3rd in the London Marathon.

In October 2018, Romanchuk won the Chicago Marathon with a time of 1:31:34; he beat defending champion Marcel Hug by one second. Less than a month later, he became the first American winner and youngest winner in the history of the New York Marathon's wheelchair event, again defeating Hug (who had won in 2016 and 2017), and again by just one second.

In 2019, Romanchuk won the Boston Marathon in 1:21:36. He became the youngest ever winner of that race, as well as the first American to win Boston since 1993. In April 2019, he won the London Marathon with a time of 1:33:38. In 2019 he also won the Chicago Marathon and he qualified to represent the United States at the 2020 Summer Paralympics held in Tokyo, Japan. He won the bronze medal in the men's marathon T54 event.

In October 2022, Romanchuk placed second in the 2022 London Marathon, with a time of 1:24:40, two seconds behind Hug.

References

External links

 
 
 

1998 births
Living people
American male wheelchair racers
Boston Marathon winners
Chicago Marathon winners
Medalists at the 2015 Parapan American Games
New York City Marathon male winners
People from Mount Airy, Maryland
People with spina bifida
Sportspeople from the Baltimore metropolitan area
Sportspeople from the Washington metropolitan area
Track and field athletes from Maryland
World Para Athletics Championships winners
Paralympic track and field athletes of the United States
Athletes (track and field) at the 2016 Summer Paralympics
Athletes (track and field) at the 2020 Summer Paralympics
Medalists at the 2020 Summer Paralympics
Paralympic gold medalists for the United States
Paralympic bronze medalists for the United States
Paralympic medalists in athletics (track and field)